The Panasonic Lumix DMC-G7 is an entry-level mirrorless camera announced on May 18, 2015, by Panasonic. The camera features a 16 MP Live MOS Sensor in combination with a Venus Engine 9 Image Processor. The camera can shoot continuously at up to 8 fps, shooting with AF and ISO 25,600. The Panasonic G7 also supports 4K video recording at 30 or 24 fps, and has built-In Wi-Fi connectivity.

In Germany, Austria, and Switzerland, the camera is named DMC-G70.

References

G7
Cameras introduced in 2015